Tamworth Football Club, an association football club based in Tamworth, Staffordshire, was founded in 1933.

Key

 P = Played
 W = Games won
 D = Games drawn
 L = Games lost
 F = Goals for
 A = Goals against
 Pts = Points
 Pos = Final position

 B'ham Combination = Birmingham Combination
 B'ham North Div = Birmingham & District Northern
 B'ham Div 1 = Birmingham & District Division 1
 B'ham Div 2 = Birmingham & District Division 2
 South Mid = Southern Midland Division
 South Prem = Southern Premier Division
 Conf North = Conference North
 Conf Prem = Conference Premier

 F = Final
 Group = Group stage
 GS2 = Second Group stage
 R16 = Round of 16
 QF = Quarter-finals
 QR1 = First Qualifying Round
 QR2 = Second Qualifying Round
 QR3 = Third Qualifying Round
 QR4 = Fourth Qualifying Round
 QR5 = Fifth Qualifying Round

 R1 = Round 1
 R2 = Round 2
 R3 = Round 3
 R4 = Round 4
 R5 = Round 5
 R6 = Round 6
 SF = Semi-finals

Seasons

Footnotes

References
General

Specific

Seasons
Tamworth